The DirecTV blimp launched in October 2007 at the MLB World Series in Boston and has been seen all over the United States since its inception. The blimp flies mainly over live sporting events but has also been seen at other entertainment and charitable venues. This second generation A-170LS Video Lightsign Lightship features the state of the art video screen that displays full color video images day or night. This lightsign, the only one of its kind in the world, is used to display messaging and advertising for DIRECTV. The blimp has been recently spotted on Twitter as followers track the journeys of the blimp from one event to another. The airship is owned and operated by an advertising company based in Florida with its airship division located in Orlando, FL.
The DIRECTV blimp was one of the three airships that took part in a blimp race held over New York City on July 4, 2011.

About the airship
The A-170LS Lightsign Lightship is a relatively new product for Lightships and enables a client to take advantage of 21st century technology to interact with its customers and activate any promotional campaign by the ability to change the message almost instantly.
The term Lightship comes from the internal illumination system which gives the advertiser of the airship a new reason to fly at night time.

The Airship's envelope and ballonet were designed and manufactured by ILC Dover. A manufacturer of flexible materials and softgoods based out of Frederick, Delaware 
The airship is also designed to carry a maximum of 8 passengers plus the pilot
The desired cruising speed can vary but it is generally around with a maximum speed of  when favorable winds are present.
The engines of this airship are from manufacturer Lycoming Engines with twin Lycoming IO 360, rated 180 HP with constant speed variable pitch reversible propellers
In order to make all the different part of the puzzle come together, the airship needs a crew of at least 14 members which includes 2 pilots, 2 crew chiefs, mechanics, video lightsign operator and additional ground team.

Camera
Camera capabilities: Gyro-stabilized camera mounting capabilities, providing an excellent platform for high-definition TV/video filming. 
The fully High-Definition ultra high performance camera is gyroscopically stabilized and mounted to the front of the airship when it is providing the aerial shots for the network television. This camera is linked to a control panel that is controlled by a camera operator who sits in the cockpit behind the pilot's chair. During each event, the camera operator and pilot work together with the show director to provide the requested shot. The camera lens can magnify what is on the ground 72 times with great definition. Camera services for the airship are provided by Flying Pictures, an aerial video company based in the United Kingdom.
The signal form the camera is transmitted via microwave downlink, which is received on site by a microwave technician with a receiving antenna array. This receiving antenna array is hard-wired into the network's production facilities, which then use the aerial camera just as they would use any other camera.

Video screen
The airship's unique light sign makes this blimp the only one of its kind. The LED screen also has the capability of displaying live video action, concerts, highlights, scoreboards and interviews according to DIRECTV's website. 
The video screen has been part of marriage proposals, birthday announcements and network commentators play by play action calling.

References

https://web.archive.org/web/20120208050500/http://www.americanblimp.com/findex.htm 
https://web.archive.org/web/20110713082846/http://www.americanblimp.com/fly.htm
https://web.archive.org/web/20121016125411/http://www.cnbc.com/id/26543354/More_On_DirecTV_s_Blimp_Why_They_Have_It
http://nycaviation.com/2011/07/new-york-city-to-host-first-blimp-race-in-25-years-on-sunday/#disqus_thread
http://www.seesawnetworks.com/2008/10/27/directv-blimp-elevates-seesaw%E2%80%99s-%E2%80%98life-patterns%E2%80%99-for-dooh-media/
http://www.ilcdover.com/Airships-Blimps/ 
http://vanwagneraerial.com

Airships of the United States
DirecTV